In quantum field theory, the Klein transformation is a redefinition of the fields to amend the spin-statistics theorem.

Bose–Einstein
Suppose φ and χ are fields such that, if x and y are spacelike-separated points and i and j represent the spinor/tensor indices,

Also suppose χ is invariant under the Z2 parity (nothing to do with spatial reflections!) mapping χ to −χ but leaving φ invariant. Obviously, free field theories always satisfy this property. Then, the Z2 parity of the number of χ particles is well defined and is conserved in time. Let's denote this parity by the operator Kχ which maps χ-even states to itself and χ-odd states into their negative. Then, Kχ is involutive, Hermitian and unitary.

Needless to say, the fields φ and χ above don't have the proper statistics relations for either a boson or a fermion. i.e. they are bosonic with respect to themselves but fermionic with respect to each other. But if you look at the statistical properties alone, we find it has exactly the same statistics as the Bose–Einstein statistics. Here's why:

Define two new fields φ' and χ' as follows:

and

This redefinition is invertible (because Kχ is). Now, the spacelike commutation relations become

Fermi–Dirac
Now, let's work with the example where 

(spacelike-separated as usual).

Assume once again we have a Z2 conserved parity operator Kχ acting upon χ alone.

Let

and

Then

More than two fields
If there are more than two fields, then one can keep applying the Klein transformation to each pair of fields with the "wrong" commutation/anticommutation relations until the desired result is obtained. 

This explains the equivalence between parastatistics and the more familiar Bose–Einstein/Fermi–Dirac statistics.

See also
 Jordan–Schwinger transformation
 Jordan–Wigner transformation
 Bogoliubov–Valatin transformation
 Holstein–Primakoff transformation

Quantum field theory